Scharnhorst was a German capital ship, alternatively described as a battleship or battlecruiser, of Nazi Germany's Kriegsmarine. She was the lead ship of her class, which included her sister ship . The ship was built at the Kriegsmarinewerft dockyard in Wilhelmshaven; she was laid down on 15 June 1935 and launched a year and four months later on 3 October 1936. Completed in January 1939, the ship was armed with a main battery of nine 28 cm (11 in) C/34 guns in three triple turrets. Plans to replace these weapons with six 38 cm (15 in) SK C/34 guns in twin turrets were never carried out.

Scharnhorst and Gneisenau operated together for much of the early portion of World War II, including sorties into the Atlantic to raid British merchant shipping. During her first operation, Scharnhorst sank the armed merchant  in a short engagement (November 1939). Scharnhorst and Gneisenau participated in Operation Weserübung (April–June 1940), the German invasion of Norway. In that engagement Scharnhorst achieved one of the longest-range naval gunfire hits in history.

In early 1942, after British bombing raids, the two ships made the Channel Dash up the English Channel from occupied France to Germany. Scharnhorst and several destroyers sortied from Norway to attack a convoy but British naval patrols intercepted the German force. During the Battle of the North Cape (26 December 1943), the Royal Navy battleship  and her escorts sank Scharnhorst. Only 36 men survived, out of a crew of 1,968.

Design 

Her standard crew numbered 56 officers and 1,613 enlisted men, augmented during the war to 60 officers and 1,780 men. While serving as a squadron flagship, Scharnhorst carried an additional 10 officers and 61 enlisted men.

She was armed with a main battery of nine 28 cm (11.1 in) L/54.5 guns arranged in three triple gun turrets: two turrets were placed forward in a superfiring arrangement (Anton and Bruno), and one aft (Caesar). The design also enabled the ship to be up-gunned with six 15-inch guns, which never took place. Her secondary armament consisted of twelve 15 cm (5.9 in) L/55 guns, eight of which were placed in two-gun turrets and the remaining four were carried in individual turrets. Her anti-aircraft armament consisted of fourteen 10.5 cm L/65 and sixteen  SK C/30 L/83, and initially ten  C/30 anti-aircraft guns. The number of 2 cm guns was eventually increased to thirty-eight.

The conning tower was protected with 350 mm on the sides.

Commanding officers 
At her commissioning, Scharnhorst was commanded by Kapitän zur See (KzS) Otto Ciliax. His tenure as the ship's commander was brief; in September 1939, an illness forced him to go on sick leave, and he was replaced by KzS Kurt-Caesar Hoffmann. Hoffmann served as the ship's captain until 1942. On 1 April 1942, Hoffmann, who had been promoted to Konteradmiral (Rear Admiral) and awarded the Knight's Cross, transferred command of the ship to KzS Friedrich Hüffmeier. In October 1943, shortly before Scharnhorsts last mission, Hüffmeier was replaced by KzS Fritz Hintze, who was killed during the ship's final battle.

Service history 

Scharnhorst was ordered as Ersatz Elsass as a replacement for the old pre-dreadnought , under the contract name "D." The Kriegsmarinewerft in Wilhelmshaven was awarded the contract, where the keel was laid on 16 July 1935. The ship was launched on 3 October 1936, witnessed by Adolf Hitler, Minister of War Generalfeldmarschall Werner von Blomberg, and the widow of Kapitän zur See Schultz, the commander of the armored cruiser , which had been sunk at the Battle of the Falkland Islands during World War I. Fitting-out work followed her launch, and was completed by January 1939. Scharnhorst was commissioned into the fleet on 9 January for sea trials, which revealed a dangerous tendency to ship considerable amounts of water in heavy seas. This caused flooding in the bow and damaged electrical systems in the forward gun turret. As a result, she went back to the dockyard for extensive modification of the bow. The original straight stem was replaced with a raised "Atlantic bow." A raked funnel cap was also installed during the reconstruction, along with an enlarged aircraft hangar; the main mast was also moved further aft. The modifications were completed by November 1939, by which time the ship was finally fully operational.

Scharnhorsts first operation began on 21 November 1939; the ship, in company with her sister , the light cruiser , and nine destroyers, was to patrol the area between Iceland and the Faroe Islands. The intent of the operation was to draw out British units and ease the pressure on the heavy cruiser ("pocket battleship") , which was being pursued in the South Atlantic. Two days later, the German flotilla intercepted the British armed merchant cruiser . At 16:07, lookouts aboard Scharnhorst spotted the vessel, and less than an hour later Scharnhorst had closed the range. At 17:03, Scharnhorst opened fire, and three minutes later a salvo of her 28 cm guns hit Rawalpindis bridge, killing the captain Edward Coverly Kennedy, and the majority of the officers. During the brief engagement, Rawalpindi managed to score a hit on Scharnhorst, which caused minor splinter damage.

By 17:16, Rawalpindi was burning badly and in the process of sinking. Admiral Wilhelm Marschall, aboard Gneisenau, ordered Scharnhorst to pick up survivors. These rescue operations were interrupted by the appearance of the cruiser . The German force quickly fled north before using inclement weather to make the dash south through the North Sea. The Germans reached Wilhelmshaven on 27 November, and on the trip both battleships incurred significant damage from heavy seas and winds. Scharnhorst was repaired in Wilhelmshaven, and while in dock, her boilers were overhauled.

Following the completion of repairs, Scharnhorst went into the Baltic Sea for gunnery training. Heavy ice in the Baltic kept the ship there until February 1940 when she could return to Wilhelmshaven, arriving on 5 February. Between 18 February and 20 February, she participated in Operation Nordmark, a brief sortie into the North Sea as far as the Shetland Islands.

Operation Weserübung 
She was then assigned to the forces participating in Operation Weserübung, the invasion of Denmark and Norway. Scharnhorst and Gneisenau were the covering force for the assaults on Narvik and Trondheim; the two ships left Wilhelmshaven on the morning of 7 April. They were joined by the heavy cruiser . Later that day, at around 14:30, the three ships came under attack by a force of British bombers, which failed to make any hits. Heavy winds caused significant structural damage that evening, and flooding contaminated a portion of Scharnhorsts fuel stores.

At 09:15 the following morning, Admiral Hipper was detached to reinforce the destroyers at Narvik, which had reported engaging British forces. Early on 9 April, the two ships encountered the British battlecruiser HMS Renown. Gneisenaus Seetakt radar picked up a radar contact at 04:30, which prompted the crews of both vessels to go to combat stations. Half an hour later, Scharnhorsts navigator spotted gun flashes from  firing at Gneisenau; the Germans returned fire three minutes later. Gneisenau was hit twice in the opening portion of the engagement, and one shell disabled her rear gun turret. Scharnhorsts radar malfunctioned, which prevented her from being able to effectively engage Renown during the battle. At 05:18, the British battlecruiser shifted fire to Scharnhorst, which maneuvered to avoid the falling shells. By 07:15, Scharnhorst and Gneisenau had used their superior speed to escape from the pursuing Renown. Heavy seas and the high speed with which the pair of battleships escaped caused them to ship large amounts of water forward. Scharnhorsts forward turret was put out of action by severe flooding.

Scharnhorst and Gneisenau had reached a point north-west of Lofoten, Norway, by 12:00 on 9 April. The two ships then turned west for 24 hours while temporary repairs were effected. After a day of steaming west, the ships turned south and rendezvoused with Admiral Hipper on 12 April. An RAF patrol aircraft spotted the three ships that day, which prompted an air attack. The German warships were protected by poor visibility, however, and the three ships safely reached port later that day. Scharnhorst returned to Germany, and was repaired at the Deutsche Werke in Kiel. During the repair process, the aircraft catapult that had been installed on the rear gun turret was removed.

Operation Juno 

The two ships left Wilhelmshaven on 4 June to return to Norway. They were joined by Admiral Hipper and four destroyers. The purpose of the sortie was to interrupt Allied efforts to resupply the Norwegians and to relieve the pressure on German troops fighting in Norway. On 7 June, the squadron rendezvoused with the tanker  to refuel Admiral Hipper and the four destroyers. The next day, the British trawler  was discovered and sunk, along with the oil tanker Oil Pioneer.  The Germans then launched their Arado 196 float planes to search for more Allied vessels. Admiral Hipper and the destroyers were sent to destroy Orama, a  passenger ship, while Atlantis, a hospital ship, was allowed to proceed unmolested. Admiral Marschall detached Admiral Hipper and the four destroyers to refuel in Trondheim, while he would steam to the Harstad area.

The shell struck the carrier's upper hangar and started a large fire. Less than ten minutes later, a shell from Gneisenau struck the bridge and killed Gloriouss captain. The two destroyers attempted to cover Glorious with smoke screens, but the German battleships could track the carrier with their radar. After approximately an hour of shooting, the German battleships sent Glorious to the bottom. They also sank the two destroyers. As Acasta sank, one of the 4 torpedoes she had fired hit Scharnhorst at 19:39. Acasta also hit Scharnhorsts forward superfiring turret with her 4.7" QF guns, which did negligible damage. The torpedo hit caused serious damage; it tore a hole  and allowed  of water into the ship. The rear turret was disabled and 48 men were killed. The ship's machinery was also significantly damaged by the flooding, and the starboard propeller shaft was destroyed.

The damage was severe enough to force Scharnhorst to put into Trondheim for temporary repairs. She reached port on the afternoon of 9 June, where the repair ship Huaskaran was waiting. The following day a reconnaissance plane from RAF Coastal Command spotted the ship, and a raid by twelve Hudson bombers took place on 11 June. The Hudsons dropped thirty-six  armor-piercing bombs, which all missed. The Royal Navy joined in the attacks on the ship by sending the battleship Rodney and the aircraft carrier . On 13 June, Ark Royal launched fifteen Skua dive bombers; German fighters intercepted the attackers and shot eight of them down. The other seven made it past the air defenses and attacked Scharnhorst, but only scored one hit, and the bomb failed to detonate. Preliminary repairs were completed by 20 June, which permitted the ship to return to Germany. While Scharnhorst was en route under heavy escort on 21 June, the British launched two air attacks, six Swordfish torpedo bombers in the first and nine Beaufort bombers in the second. Both were driven off by anti-aircraft fire and fighters. The Germans intercepted British radio traffic that indicated the Royal Navy was at sea, which prompted Scharnhorst to make for Stavanger. British warships were within  of Scharnhorsts position when she turned to Stavanger. The next day, Scharnhorst left Stavanger for Kiel, where repairs were carried out, lasting some six months.

Operation Berlin 

Following the completion of repairs, Scharnhorst underwent trials in the Baltic before returning to Kiel in December 1940. There she joined Gneisenau, in preparation for Operation Berlin, a planned raid into the Atlantic Ocean designed to wreak havoc on the Allied shipping lanes. Severe storms caused damage to Gneisenau but Scharnhorst was undamaged. The two ships were forced to put into port during the storm: Scharnhorst went to Gotenhafen while Gneisenau went to Kiel for repairs. Repairs were quickly completed, and on 22 January 1941, the two ships, under the command of Admiral Günther Lütjens, left port for the North Atlantic. They were detected in the Skagerrak and the heavy units of the British Home Fleet deployed to cover the passage between Iceland and the Faroes. The Germans' radar detected the British at long range, which allowed Lütjens to avoid the British patrols, with the aid of a squall. By 3 February, the two battleships had evaded the last British cruiser patrol, and had broken into the open Atlantic.

On 6 February, the two ships refueled from the tanker Schlettstadt south of Cape Farewell. Shortly after 08:30 on 8 February, lookouts spotted convoy HX 106, escorted by the battleship . Lütjens' orders prohibited him from engaging Allied capital ships, and so the attack was called off. Lütjens ordered Hoffmann to rejoin the flagship immediately. The two battleships steamed off to the northwest to search for more shipping. On 22 February, the pair spotted an empty convoy sailing west, which dispersed at the appearance of the battleships. Scharnhorst managed to sink only one ship during the encounter, the 6000 ton tanker Lustrous.

Lütjens then decided to move to a new area, as the surviving members of the dispersed convoy had sent distress signals. He chose the Cape Town-Gibraltar convoy route, and positioned himself to the northwest of Cape Verde. The two ships encountered convoy SL 67, escorted by the battleship , on 8 March. Lütjens again forbade an attack, but he shadowed the convoy and directed U-boats to attack. A pair of U-boats sank a total of 28,488 tons of shipping on the night of 8–9 March. He instead turned toward the mid-Atlantic, where Scharnhorst sank the Greek cargo ship Marathon. The two ships then refueled from the tankers Uckermark and Ermland on 12 March.

On 15 March, the two battleships, with the two tankers in company, encountered a dispersed convoy in the mid-Atlantic. Scharnhorst sank two ships. Several days later, the main body of the convoy was located, and Scharnhorst sank another seven ships totaling 27,277 tons. Scharnhorst and Gneisenau used their high speed to escape in a squall, and the intervention by the British battleships convinced Lütjens that the chances of further success were small. He therefore decided to head for Brest in occupied France, which the ships reached on 22 March. Throughout the operation, Scharnhorst had difficulties with the superheater tubes in her boilers. Repair work lasted until July, which caused the ship to be unavailable during Operation Rheinübung, the sortie by the new battleship  in May 1941.

Air raid on 24 July 1941 
She did not return to Brest to avoid an undesirable concentration of heavy units in one port (the Prinz Eugen had arrived there on 21 July) but moored alongside at La Pallice on 23 July. The RAF had planned a large, complicated raid on the capital ships in Brest for the night of 24 July, but an aerial reconnaissance photograph of Scharnhorst in her berth at La Pallice caused a last minute alteration to the operation. The Halifax heavy bombers of No. 35 Squadron RAF and No. 76 Squadron RAF flew the extra  to reach Scharnhorst and the rest of the raid on Brest went ahead as planned, with Prinz Eugen and Gneisenau as their principal targets. The 15 Halifaxes attacked Scharnhorst at her moorings. They scored five hits in an almost straight line on the starboard side, parallel to the centerline. One of the 227 kg bombs hit the deck just forward of the starboard 15 cm twin turret next to the conning tower. It passed through the upper and middle decks before exploding on the main armored deck, which contained the blast. The joints with the torpedo bulkhead were weakened enough to cause leaking. The second 227 kg bomb fell forward of the rear main battery turret and penetrated the first two decks. It also exploded on the armored deck and tore a small hole in it. The explosion caused splinter damage and disabled the ammunition hoists for the 37 mm anti-aircraft guns.

Two of the 454 kg bombs hit amidships between the 15 cm and 10.5 cm gun turrets; both failed to explode and instead penetrated the ship completely. The first went through each deck and exited the ship through the double bottom, while the other was deflected by the torpedo bulkhead and penetrated the hull beneath the side belt armor. It too failed to detonate, and passed through the side of the hull, which was not protected by the main armor belt. These three hits caused significant flooding and an 8 degree list to starboard. The forward and rear gun turrets were temporarily disabled, along with half of her anti-aircraft battery. Two men were killed and fifteen were injured in the attack. On the morning of 25 July, one of the escorting destroyers shot down a British patrol plane. The ship reached Brest later that day and went into dry dock for repairs, which took 4 months. While the damage was being repaired, a new radar system was installed aft, the power output for the forward radar was increased to 100 kW, and the 53.3 cm torpedo tubes were installed.

The strategic position following the damage to Scharnhorst was serious. Gneisenau was still being repaired following torpedo damage on 6 April and bomb damage on 9–10 April. Prinz Eugen had been seriously damaged by a bomb on 1 July. Bismarck had been sunk on 27 May. All German capital ships deployed to the Atlantic were therefore out of action. In addition,  was still working up and not ready for service; Lützow had been seriously damaged by a torpedo on 13 June 1941;  and Admiral Hipper were in dockyards for maintenance.

Operation Cerberus 

On 12 January 1942, the German Naval Command, in a conference with Hitler, made the decision to return Scharnhorst, Gneisenau, and the heavy cruiser Prinz Eugen to Germany. The intention was to deploy the vessels to Norway to interdict Allied convoys to the Soviet Union. The so-called "Channel Dash", codenamed Operation Cerberus, would avoid the increasingly effective Allied radar and patrol aircraft in the Atlantic. Vice Admiral Otto Ciliax, Scharnhorsts first commander, was given command of the operation. In early February, minesweepers swept a route through the English Channel undetected by the British.

At 23:00 on 11 February, Scharnhorst, Gneisenau, and Prinz Eugen left Brest. The British failed to detect their departure, as the submarine that had been tasked with observing the port had withdrawn to recharge its batteries. By 06:30, they had passed Cherbourg, at which point they were joined by a flotilla of torpedo boats. The torpedo boats were led by Kapitän Erich Bey, aboard the destroyer . General der Jagdflieger (General of Fighter Force) Adolf Galland directed Luftwaffe fighter and bomber forces (Operation Donnerkeil) during Cerberus. The fighters flew at masthead-height to avoid detection by the British radar network. Liaison officers were present on all three ships. German aircraft arrived later to jam British radar with chaff. By 13:00, the ships had cleared the Strait of Dover; half an hour later, a flight of six Swordfish torpedo bombers, with Spitfire escort, attacked the Germans. The British failed to penetrate the Luftwaffe fighter shield, and all six Swordfish were destroyed.

Scharnhorst did not make the voyage unscathed, however; at 15:31 she struck an air-dropped magnetic mine in the mouth of the Scheldt, abreast of the forward superfiring turret. The blast damaged the ship's circuit breakers and knocked out her electrical system for 20 minutes. The explosive shock caused serious damage; turret Bruno was jammed, as were the twin and single 15 cm mounts on the port side. The blast also damaged the fuel oil pumps and the bearings in the turbo-generators, which brought the ship to a halt. The power outage disabled the emergency shut-off switches to the boilers and turbines, which could not be turned off until power was restored. The explosion tore a large gash in the side of the hull and allowed  of water into the ship, flooding 30 watertight spaces within five main watertight compartments. Scharnhorst took on a list of one degree and was down by the bows by a meter.

While the ship was immobilized, Admiral Ciliax transferred to Z29. The engine room crews managed to restart the first turbine at 15:49, nearly twenty minutes after the mine explosion. Once the ship was back under way, twelve Beauforts launched a 10-minute attack that was beaten off by anti-aircraft fire and the escorting Luftwaffe fighters. The British carried out a series of attacks that were all unsuccessful; Scharnhorsts anti-aircraft guns were red-hot by the end of the action, and one 20 mm gun had burst from the strain.

The ship struck another mine off Terschelling on the starboard side at 22:34. The mine briefly knocked out the power system and temporarily disabled the rudders. Two of the three turbines were jammed, and the third had to be turned off. Another  tons of water flooded ten watertight spaces in four main compartments. Only the centerline shaft was operational, which permitted a speed of only . The shock damaged the rotating parts of all of the ship's gun turrets, and three of the 15 cm turrets were seriously jammed. By 08:00, Scharnhorst had reached the Jade Bight but ice prevented the ship from entering Wilhelmshaven. While waiting outside the port, Admiral Ciliax returned to the ship. The ice had been cleared by noon, permitting Scharnhorsts entrance to Wilhelmshaven. Two days later, Scharnhorst went to Kiel for permanent repairs. Work was conducted in a floating dry dock and lasted until July 1942. Afterward, another round of trials were conducted in the Baltic, which revealed the necessity of replacing several of the boiler tubes.

Deployment to Norway 
In early August 1942, Scharnhorst conducted exercises in cooperation with several U-boats. Work was completed by September, and the ship conducted further training in the Baltic. Scharnhorst steamed to Gotenhafen in late October for a new rudder, the design of which was based on the lessons learned from the torpedoing of Prinz Eugen and Lützow earlier in the year. Boiler and turbine troubles kept the ship in Germany for the remainder of 1942. By December, only two of the three shafts were operational and a complete overhaul of the propulsion system was required. In early January 1943, the ship was back in service, and after trials, left Germany on 7 January in company with Prinz Eugen and five destroyers. Reports of heavy activity in British airfields near the coast prompted the force to return to port, however. Another attempt to reach Norway was canceled under similar circumstances. On 8 March, however, poor weather grounded the British bombers, and so Scharnhorst and four destroyers were able to make the journey to Norway. At 16:00 on 14 March, Scharnhorst dropped anchor in Bogen Bay outside Narvik. There she met Lützow and the battleship Tirpitz.

On 22 March, Scharnhorst, Tirpitz, and Lützow steamed to Altafjord for repairs to damage incurred in heavy storms. In early April, Scharnhorst, Tirpitz, and nine destroyers conducted a training mission to Bear Island in the Arctic Ocean. On the 8th, a serious internal explosion occurred in the aft auxiliary machinery space above the armor deck. The explosion killed or injured 34 men and prompted the crew to flood the magazines for turret Caesar as a precaution against a magazine explosion. A repair ship completed work on the vessel in two weeks. Fuel shortages prevented major operations for the next six months, during which Scharnhorst was able to conduct only short training maneuvers.

Scharnhorst, Tirpitz, and nine destroyers embarked from Altafjord on an offensive on 6 September known as Operation Zitronella; the ships were tasked with bombarding the island of Spitzbergen. During the operation, Scharnhorst destroyed a battery of two  guns and shelled fuel tanks, coal mines, harbor facilities, and military installations. Of particular importance was the weather station that was transmitting weather information to the Allies, which was used to schedule convoys to the Soviet Union. The destroyers landed some 1,000 troops, which pushed the Norwegian garrison into the mountains, completing the mission without major loss. On 22 September, a pair of British X-craft mini-submarines attacked and seriously damaged Tirpitz, which reduced the Arctic Task Force to Scharnhorst and her five escorting destroyers.

Battle of the North Cape 

With the rapidly deteriorating military situation for the German Army on the Eastern Front, it became increasingly important to interrupt the flow of supplies from the Western Allies to the Soviet Union. By December 1943, the German Army was forced into continuous retreat. The Luftwaffe had been seriously weakened by four long years of war, and increasing Allied anti-submarine capabilities were steadily degrading the effectiveness of the U-boats. The only effective weapon at the disposal of the Germans in Norway was Scharnhorst; Tirpitz had been badly damaged, and the four remaining heavy cruisers were committed to the Baltic. During a conference with Hitler on 19–20 December, Großadmiral Karl Dönitz decided to employ Scharnhorst against the next Allied convoy that presented itself. Erich Bey, by now promoted to Konteradmiral, was given command of the task force.

On 22 December Dönitz ordered Bey to be ready to go to sea on a three-hour notice. The convoy was spotted again two days later, and it was determined that the course was definitively toward the Soviet Union. A U-boat reported the convoy's location at 09:00 on 25 December, and Dönitz ordered Scharnhorst into action. In his instructions to Bey, Dönitz advised him to break off the engagement if presented with superior forces, but to remain aggressive. Bey planned to attack the convoy at 10:00 on 26 December if the conditions were favorable for the attack. At this time of year, there was only 45 minutes of full daylight and six hours of twilight, which significantly limited Bey's operational freedom. The Germans were concerned with developments in Allied radar-directed fire control, which allowed British battleships to fire with great accuracy in the darkness; German radar capabilities lagged behind those of their opponents.

Scharnhorst and her five destroyers left port at around 19:00 and were in the open sea four hours later. At 03:19, Bey received instructions from the Fleet Command that Scharnhorst was to conduct the attack alone if heavy seas interfered with the destroyers' ability to fight. Unbeknown to the Germans, the British were able to read the ciphered Enigma radio transmissions between Scharnhorst and the Fleet Command; Admirals Robert Burnett and Bruce Fraser were aware of Bey's plan for the attack on the convoy and could position their forces accordingly. Fraser in the powerful battleship , along with the cruiser  and four destroyers, moved to a position southwest of Scharnhorst to block a possible escape attempt.

An hour after making the turn, Bey deployed his destroyers in a line screening Scharnhorst, which remained  behind. Half an hour later, Scharnhorsts loudspeakers called the crew to battle stations in preparation for the attack. At 08:40, Belfast picked up Scharnhorst on her radar. Unaware that they had been detected, the Germans had turned off their radar to prevent the British from picking up on the signals. The cruiser opened fire three minutes later, followed by Norfolk two minutes after. Scharnhorst fired a salvo from turret Caesar before turning and increasing speed to disengage from the cruisers. The battleship was hit twice by 20.3 cm (8 in) shells; the first failed to explode and caused negligible damage, but the second struck the forward rangefinders and destroyed the radar antenna. The aft radar, which possessed only a limited forward arc, was the ship's only remaining radar capability.

Scharnhorst turned south and attempted to work around the cruisers, but the superior British radar prevented Bey from successfully carrying out the maneuver. By 12:00, Scharnhorst was to the northeast of the convoy, but Belfast had reestablished radar contact; it took the cruisers twenty minutes to close the range and begin firing. Scharnhorst detected the cruisers with her aft radar and opened fire with her main battery guns before turning away to disengage a second time. Shortly before 12:25, Scharnhorst hit Norfolk twice with 28 cm shells. The first shell hit the forward superstructure and disabled Norfolks gunnery radar. The second 28 cm round struck the ship's "X" barbette and disabled the turret. Scharnhorst then turned again and increased speed, in the hopes of escaping the cruisers and finding the convoy. Burnett chose to keep his distance and shadow Scharnhorst with radar while Fraser made his way to the scene in Duke of York. Meanwhile, the five German destroyers continued searching for the convoy without success. At 13:15, Bey decided to return to base, and at 13:43, he dismissed the destroyers and instructed them to return to port.

At 16:17, Duke of York made radar contact with Scharnhorst; thirty minutes later, Belfast illuminated the German battleship with star shells. Five minutes after opening fire, one of Duke of Yorks 14 in (35.6 cm) shells struck Scharnhorst abreast of her forward gun turret. The shell hit jammed the turret's training gears, putting it out of action. Shell splinters started a fire in the ammunition magazine, which forced the Germans to flood both forward magazines to prevent an explosion. The water was quickly drained from turret Bruno's magazine. The ship was now fighting with only two-thirds of her main battery. Shortly thereafter, another 14 in shell struck the ventilation trunk attached to Bruno, which caused the turret to be flooded with noxious propellant gases every time the breeches were opened. A third shell hit the deck next to turret Caesar and caused some flooding; shell splinters caused significant casualties. At 17:30, shells struck the forward 15 cm gun turrets and destroyed them both.

At around 18:00, another 14 in shell struck the ship on the starboard side, passed through the thin upper belt armor, and exploded in the number 1 boiler room. She managed to add  to the distance between her and Duke of York, while straddling the ship with several salvos. Shell splinters rained on Duke of York and disabled the fire-control radar.

At 18:42, Duke of York ceased fire, having fired 52 salvos and having scored at least 13 hits, but Scharnhorst was pulling away. Many of these hits had badly damaged the ship's secondary armament, which left her open to destroyer attacks, which Fraser ordered. The destroyers  and  launched a total of eight torpedoes at 18:50, four of which hit. One torpedo exploded abreast of turret Bruno, which caused it to jam. The second torpedo hit the ship on the port side and caused some minor flooding, and the third struck toward the rear of the ship and damaged the port propeller shaft. The fourth hit the ship in the bow. With only turret Caesar operational, all available men were sent to retrieve ammunition from the forward turrets to keep the last heavy guns supplied. Fraser then ordered Jamaica and Belfast to move into range and finish the crippled ship off with torpedoes. After several more torpedo hits, Scharnhorst settled further into the water and began to list to starboard. At 19:45, the ship went down by the bow, with her propellers still slowly turning. British ships began searching for survivors, but were soon ordered away after just a few were pulled out of the water even though voices could still be heard calling for help from the darkness. Of the crew of 1,968 officers and enlisted men, only 36 men survived.

Wreck discovery 

In September 2000, a joint expedition to find the sunken battleship conducted by the BBC, NRK, and the Royal Norwegian Navy began. The underwater survey vessel Sverdrup II, operated by the Norwegian Defence Research Establishment, was used to scan the sea floor. After locating a large submerged object, the research team then used the Royal Norwegian Navy's underwater recovery vessel  to examine the object visually. The wreck was positively identified by an ROV on 10 September, which located armament consistent with that of Scharnhorst. The hull lies upside down on the seabed, with debris, including the main mast and rangefinders, scattered around the wreck. Extensive damage from shellfire and torpedoes is evident; the bow was blown off, presumably from a magazine explosion in the forward turrets, and lies in a tangled mass of steel some distance from the rest of the hull.

Notes

References 
 
 
 
 
 
 
 
 
 
 
 
 
 
 
 
 

Online sources

Further reading 
 
 
 

1936 ships
Maritime incidents in December 1943
Scharnhorst-class battleships
Ships built in Wilhelmshaven
World War II battleships of Germany
World War II shipwrecks in the Arctic Ocean
2000 archaeological discoveries